{{Speciesbox
| image = Anomala vitis on a leaf.jpg
| taxon = Anomala vitis
| authority = Fabricius, 1775
| synonyms ={{Collapsible list 
|Anomala variabilisSchilsky, 1888
|Anomala vitis azurescens Reitter, 1903
|Anomala vitis cupreonitens" Bau, 1883
|Anomala vitis dichroa Reitter, 1903
|Anomala vitis fuscipennis Ohaus, 1915
|Anomala vitis lutea Schilsky, 1888
|Anomala vitis pseudoazurescens Dellacasa, 1970
|Anomala vitis pseudosignata Dellacasa, 1970
|Anomala vitis signata Schilsky, 1888
|Anomala vitis viridicollis Schilsky, 1888
|Melolontha holosericea Illiger, 1805}} 
}}Anomala vitis, the vine chafer, is a species of scarab (beetle of the family Scarabaeidae). It has a palearctic distribution. Like many Anomala'' species, it is regarded as a pest of agricultural crops, in this case grapevines.

References

Rutelinae
Beetles described in 1775
Taxa named by Johan Christian Fabricius